Cornus obliqua, the blue-fruited dogwood, silky dogwood, or pale dogwood, is a flowering shrub of eastern North America in the dogwood family, Cornaceae. It is sometimes considered a subspecies of Cornus amomum, which is also known as silky dogwood. It was first described in 1820 by Constantine Samuel Rafinesque. It is in the subgenus Kraniopsis.

References

obliqua
Flora of North America
Plants described in 1820
Taxa named by Constantine Samuel Rafinesque